Lee Sima Falkon (born 7 May 1992) is an Israeli football player who plays as a forward for Maccabi Emek Hefer.

Club career

ASA Tel Aviv University
After a few seasons training with Bnot Tiv'on Falkon started playing in the local senior league, where she joined ASA Tel Aviv University as she was attracted to their "eternal losers" tag. During her time at ASA Tel Aviv University, the club won 5 Ligat Nashim titles and 3 Israeli Women's Cup wins. At the age of 18, after receiving an "elite sportswoman" status from the army, Falkon decided to go to college in Kentucky to further her professional development, but returned to ASA Tel Aviv University when she discovered it wasn't what she expected.

SC Sand
After finishing her army service, Falkon was invited to join SC Sand in the 2. Frauen-Bundesliga. She arrived after recovering from a nine-month injury and had a hard time fitting in, so after a few months she returned to Israel.

Brøndby IF
After scoring a goal in Israel's away match against Denmark in the 2015 FIFA Women's World Cup qualification, Falkon received an offer to sign with local Danish club Brøndby IF. She had a great season with them including making the UEFA Women's Champions League quarter-finals, but left as she wasn't making enough money to function financially.

MSV Duisburg
In August 2015, Falkon joined recently relegated MSV Duisburg together with Israeli teammate Mairav Shamir on one-year contracts with an extension option. Falkon helped MSV Duisburg get promoted back to the Frauen-Bundesliga, and in April 2017 was the first Israeli footballer to be selected by Adidas to be sponsored.

Western Sydney Wanderers
Falkon joined Western Sydney Wanderers ahead of the 2017–18 season.

International career
At the age of 13, Falkon joined Israel U19 team to give her a framework to play in, as there were no women's junior leagues functioning in Israel.

Falkon became a leading player in the senior side too, having over 30 international caps.

Honours
ASA Tel Aviv University
Winner
 Ligat Nashim (3): 2011–12, 2012–13, 2013–14
 Israeli Women's Cup (2): 2011–12, 2013–14

References

External links
 

1992 births
Living people
Israeli Jews
Israeli women's footballers
Israel women's international footballers
ASA Tel Aviv University players
SC Sand players
Brøndby IF (women) players
MSV Duisburg (women) players
Western Sydney Wanderers FC (A-League Women) players
Expatriate women's footballers in Germany
Expatriate women's footballers in Denmark
Frauen-Bundesliga players
A-League Women players
Women's association football midfielders
Women's association football forwards
Footballers from Northern District (Israel)